Aprasia inaurita, also known as the mallee worm-lizard or red-tailed worm-lizard, is a species of lizard in the family Pygopodidae. It is endemic to Australia.

References

Aprasia
Pygopodids of Australia
Endemic fauna of Australia
Reptiles described in 1974
Taxa named by Arnold G. Kluge